Decoys is a Canadian comedy web series, which premiered in 2020 on CBC Gem. The series centres on a group of duck decoy carvers who are competing for the top award at the Northern Alberta Carving Cup.

The cast includes David Pelech, Rup Magon, Kelly Van der Burg, Nelu Handa, Alice Moran, Brian Paul, Keram Malicki-Sánchez, Brandon Oakes, Tracey Hoyt and Rodrigo Fernandez-Stoll. Pelech was the creator of the series.

The series received two Canadian Screen Award nominations at the 9th Canadian Screen Awards in 2021, for Best Fiction Web Program or Series and Best Supporting Performance in Web Program or Series (Hoyt).

Episodes

References

External links

2020 web series debuts
Canadian comedy web series
CBC Gem original programming
Television shows set in Alberta